The 1995 World Table Tennis Championships women's singles was the 43rd edition of the women's singles championship.
Deng Yaping defeated Qiao Hong in the final by three sets to two, to win the title.

Results

See also
List of World Table Tennis Championships medalists

References

-
World
Tab